Ugiodes cinerea is a species of moth in the family Erebidae.  It is found in Ghana.

References

Endemic fauna of Ghana
Moths described in 1926
Ugiodes